Dorian Ulrey (born July 11, 1987, in Silvis, Illinois) is a professional runner sponsored by Brooks.

NCAA
Dorian was the 2010 NCAA Division 1 national champion at 3000 meters, an 11-time all American, 3-time Missouri Valley Conference champion, 8-time SEC champion, 2009 World Championship 1500 meter semi-finalist, and 2009 Team USA world championship member.

He attended the University of Northern Iowa and the University of Arkansas.

Professional
Ulrey finished 15th in 1500 meters at 2016 US Olympic Trials (track and field).

References

External links 
  
 
 
 

1987 births
Living people
People from Rock Island County, Illinois
American male middle-distance runners
Arkansas Razorbacks men's track and field athletes